The Battle of Hitotoribashi or Battle of Hitadori Bridge was a battle during the Azuchi-Momoyama period (16th century) of Japan. Due to the death of Date Masamune's father, Date Terumune by the hands of Nihonmatsu Yoshitsugu, Masamune swore vengeance. 

After succeeding to the throne of the Date clan, Masamune would effectively have his revenge by launching an attack against the Nihonmatsu clan and their allies at Hitotoribashi in January 1586. Despite a large imbalance between the forces (Date: 7,000; Nihonmatsu: 30,000), the alliance assembled in support of the Nihonmatsu forces disintegrated and withdrew after beating Masamune back into the Motomiya Castle.

Background 

After Terumune was abducted and killed near Abukuma river, a general war proceeded between the Date clan and their traditional rivals the Nihonmatsu clan. The Nihonmatsu allied with the Sōma, Satake, and Ashina clans.  The allies marched with their 30,000 troops toward Motomiya Castle. Masamune with only 7,000 troops prepared a defensive strategy, including forts that were on the way to Motomiya Castle.

Battle 
At the opening of battle on the 6th, Masamune led his forces from Motomiya Castle, crossed the Adatara River, and encamped at Mount Kannondō. Three of Masamune's forts were taken, and although Masamune tried to force back the Satake allies from the Seto River, he failed. 
Two detachments were left to protect the rearguard and east flank, under chief retainers Oniniwa Yoshinao and Date Shigezane; both slowed the Satake allies long enough for Masamune to escape to Motomiya. Shigezane survived, but Yoshinao was killed in action. 

The next morning, the Date forces found that the Satake clan had withdrawn and its allies had scattered. In the Satake armies' absence from their home territory in Hitachi Province, Hōjō clan partisans Edo Yoshimichi and Satomi Yoshiyori had attacked; further, in the encampment near Motomiya castle, Satake vassal and senior commander Onozaki Yoshimasa was assassinated. In the midst of this crisis, the clan forces thus withdrew.

References 

1586 in Japan
Hitotoribashi 1586
Hitotoribashi
Date clan
Hitotoribashi